Groupe de Chasse or groupe de chasse (usually abbreviated as GC) is the French language term for "fighter group" or "fighter wing". More literal translations include "pursuit group" (the US term for fighter groups prior to 1942) and "hunting group" (similar to the German language Jagdgruppe or JG).

Composition
A group de chasse may include one to four escadrilles, each of which comprises 10–12 aircraft. The commanding officer of a GC is usually a Commandant, Lieutenant-colonel or Colonel.

Units
Specific units known by the name groupe de chasse include:

Groupe de Chasse (Belgium) a Belgian unit of World War I

Groupe de Chasse Polonaise I/145 a Polish unit fighting alongside France in 1940

France
Including:
 Armee de l'Air
 Armée de l'air de Vichy
 Forces Aériennes Françaises Libres

Units
Groupe de Chasse I/1
Groupe de Chasse I/3
Groupe de Chasse I/8
Groupe de Chasse I/13
Groupe de Chasse II/1
Groupe de Chasse II/5
Groupe de Chasse II/6
Groupe de Chasse II/8 
Groupe de Chasse II/9
Groupe de Chasse II/10
Groupe de Chasse III (Normandie-Niemen)
Groupe de Chasse III/2 (GC Alsace)
Groupe de Chasse III/3
Normandie-Niemen (also known as GC III)
Groupe de Chasse Alsace (GC III/2)
Groupe de Chasse III/6
Groupe de Chasse III/9
Groupe de Chasse III/10
Groupe de Chasse III/13
Groupe de Chasse IV/2 (GC Île-de-France)
Groupe de Chasse Île-de-France (also known as GC IV/2)

References

Bibliography

Air force units and formations
Air units and formations of France in World War II
Military units and formations of the French Air and Space Force

fr:Groupe de Chasse